Frederick Abbott may refer to:

Frederick Abbott (Indian Army officer) (1805–1892), English army officer
Frederic Vaughan Abbot (1858–1928), American army officer and engineer
Frederick M. Abbott (born 1952), American legal academic
Frederick Abbott (cricketer) (1901–1952), New Zealand-born English cricketer
Fred Abbott (1874–1935), Major League Baseball catcher
Fredric Abbott (1928–1996), Australian actor